Events in the year 2018 in the Gambia.

Incumbents

President: Adama Barrow 

Vice-President of the Gambia: Fatoumata Tambajang

Chief Justice: Hassan Bubacar Jallow

Events

February
 8 February - The Gambia rejoins the Commonwealth of Nations, after former President Yahya Jammeh withdrew from it five years ago calling it a "neocolonial institution", to rebuild the Gambia's image.

April
 1 April - President Barrow accuses supporters of former President Jammeh of supporting rebels in Senegal's Casamance region.

Deaths

2 March – Omar Sey, politician and sports administrator (b. 1941).

References

 
2010s in the Gambia 
Years of the 21st century in the Gambia 
Gambia 
Gambia